Keith Boykin is an American TV and film producer, national political commentator, author, and former White House aide to President Bill Clinton. He has made much of this public in his 2022 memoir, Quitting: Why I Left My Job to Live a Life of Freedom.

Early life 
Boykin was raised in St. Louis, Missouri, and later attended Countryside High School in Clearwater, Florida.

During his time in St. Louis, Boykin primarily resided in the mostly white suburb of Florissant. Early on, he developed an interest in government and leadership. He participated in student government and several sports including track-and-field and wrestling.

At the age of fifteen, Boykin moved to Florida with his father, William O. Boykin, who relocated to the state to start a beauty supply business. Despite the move, Keith became the president of his school's student government as well as an editor of the school newspaper. He was also an award-winning debater and varsity track-and-field athlete.

Keith matriculated at Dartmouth College in 1983. In 1984, he was awarded the William S. Churchill Prize for outstanding freshman. Then, in 1987, he won the Barrett Cup for the most distinguished member of the graduating class.

After graduating from Dartmouth, Boykin worked for Michael Dukakis's presidential campaign from June 1987 to November 1988. Later, he began his studies at Harvard Law School in 1989. While at Harvard, he edited the Civil Rights-Civil Liberties Law Review journal. He also participated in The Coalition for Civil Rights, a student group dedicated to diversifying the law school's faculty. While a member of that group, he joined ten other students in a racial discrimination lawsuit against the law school.

Career 
After graduating from Harvard in 1992, Boykin began working at a San Francisco law firm where he had previously interned. However, he left that position in order to work for Bill Clinton's presidential campaign as the Midwest Press Director.

Following Bill Clinton's victory in 1992, Boykin joined the Clinton White House as a Special Assistant to the President. He also served as Director of News Analysis. After some time in that role, he was promoted to Director of Specialty Media. In April 1993, Boykin helped to arrange the first meeting between an acting U.S. president and representatives from the LGBTQ community. That meeting included 8 members drawn from three LGBTQ organizations: The National Gay and Lesbian Task Force, the Black Gay and Lesbian Leadership forum, and the March on Washington Committee.

Boykin left his role at the White House in January 1995 in order to write his first book, One More River to Cross: Black and Gay in America, which detailed the special burdens black LGBTQ people experience. Later, he would write Beyond the Down Low: Sex, Lies, and Denial in Black America, a New York Times bestseller.

In late 1995, Boykin became the executive director of the National Black Gay and Lesbian Forum, a national non-profit dedicated to the uplift of Black Gays and Lesbians. In Quitting, Boykin describes his time with the organization as an important professional experience. He writes: "we organized a historic contingent in the Million Man March, held 3 national conferences, opened an office in the nation's capital, hired a small staff, and hosted popular community events in Washington."

Boykin spoke at the Millennium March on Washington for LGBTQIA rights in 2000.

From 1999 to 2001, Boykin taught Political Science as an adjunct professor at American University in Washington, D.C. In 2001, Boykin left American University to move to New York City where he co-founded the National Black Justice Coalition in 2003. According to the NBJC website, the organization's mission is to "end racism, homophobia, and LGBTQ/SGL bias and stigma."

In 2004, Keith Boykin and his partner at the time, Nathan Hale Williams, made television history as the first openly black gay couple to appear on a reality television show, when they appeared on the Showtime reality TV series "American Candidate."

In 2005, Minister Louis Farrakhan invited Keith to speak during the tenth anniversary commemoration of the Million Man March. At the last minute, however, the invitation was rescinded without a clear explanation. One of the leaders of the March, the Revered Willie F. Wilson, objected to Boykin's presence.

In February 2006, Boykin became co-host of the TV series "My Two Cents" on the BET J channel. My Two Cents was promoted as an "urban current events" show which explored topical issues relevant to black audiences. He also worked as an associate producer of the 2006 film "Dirty Laundry."

From 2008 to 2016, Boykin served as a contributor for CNBC. From January 2017 until January 2022, Boykin served as contributor for CNN. He has appeared on several other broadcast news outlets such as VH1, BET, MSNBC, Fox News, NPR.

In addition, Boykin has made appearances on numerous other television shows such as The Montel Williams Show, The Dennis Miller Show, The Tom Joyner Morning Show, Tony Brown's Journal, and Anderson Cooper 360. He has also been featured on the cover of several publications including A&U, Out and The Advocate, and he was selected as one of Out Magazine's "Out 100" in 2004. He has also been featured or quoted in articles in The New York Times, The Washington Post, USA Today, VIBE, and Jet. He has also appeared on BET's "Being Mary Jane" in 2014.

Some of the publications he has written for include The New York Times, The Washington Post, The Village Voice, the San Francisco Chronicle, the St. Petersburg Times, The Advocate, Black Issues Book Review, and The Crisis. His syndicated column appeared in several newspapers across the country, including The New York Blade, the Washington Blade, Southern Voice, and the Houston Voice.

Personal life
Boykin's great-great-grandfather, John H. Dickerson, served as the grand master of the Colored Masons of Florida from 1889 until 1916. He was also the chairman of the 1912 Florida State Republican Convention. Boykin's great-grandfather, Horatio Dickerson, served in an all-black military infantry known as the Harlem Hellfighters (The 369th Infantry Regiment, originally formed as the 15th New York National Guard Regiment ) from 1917 until 1919. Boykin's grandfather, John H. Dickerson, Sr., served as principal of Campbell Street Elementary School in Daytona Beach, Florida.

In 1996, Boykin revealed his sexual orientation in the book One More River to Cross: Black & Gay in America.

In 2006, Boykin won a gold medal in wrestling at the 2006 Gay Games.

Boykin met his biological father, John Dickerson, a chemist for Miami-Dade Pollution Center, in 2015.

After the death of Cuban leader Fidel Castro in December 2016, Boykin attended Castro's funeral procession in Santiago de Cuba with his Cuban partner and watched the remains of the leader pass through the Plaza de Marte.

In 2022, Boykin moved to Los Angeles but he also maintained his residence in New York City. He has two godsons whom he considers his 'sons'.

Published works

 "One More River to Cross: Black & Gay in America", Anchor Publisher, 1996, 
 "Respecting the Soul: Daily Reflections for Black Lesbians and Gays", Avon Books, April 1, 1999, 
 "Beyond the Down Low: Sex, Lies, and Denial in Black America", Carroll & Graf, December 13, 2004, 
 "For Colored Boys Who Have Considered Suicide When The Rainbow Is Still Not Enough", Magnus Books, August 28, 2012, 
 "Race Against Time: The Politics of a Darkening America", Bold Type Books, September 14, 2021, 
 "Quitting: Why I Left My Job to Live a Life of Freedom," Scribd Originals, October 12, 2022,

See also
 Broadcast journalism
 LGBT culture in New York City
 List of LGBT people from New York City
 New Yorkers in journalism

References

External links
 
 
 Dartmouth College Alums for Social Change

1965 births
African-American novelists
21st-century American novelists
American University faculty and staff
Dartmouth College alumni
LGBT African Americans
American gay writers
Harvard Law School alumni
Lambda Literary Award winners
Stonewall Book Award winners
Living people
Participants in American reality television series
American LGBT novelists
American male novelists
American male essayists
American male short story writers
21st-century American short story writers
21st-century American essayists
21st-century American male writers
21st-century African-American writers
20th-century African-American people
African-American male writers